Black to the Future may also refer to:

 Black to the Future (Hugh Masekela album), a 1998 jazz album by Hugh Masekela
 Black to the Future (Sons of Kemet album), a 2021 jazz album  by Sons of Kemet
 Black to the Future (TV series) is a 2009 television mini-series that originally aired on VH1
 Timewasters, a 2017 UK time-travel comedy TV programme developed under the title Black to the Future

See also 

 Black from the Future, a 2016 hip-hop album by Grand Puba
 Back to the Future (disambiguation)